Madonna and Child is an oil on oak panel painting by Perugino. It dates to around 1501 and is now in the National Gallery of Art in Washington.

Bibliography 
  Vittoria Garibaldi, Perugino, in Pittori del Rinascimento, Scala, Florence, 2004 
  Pierluigi De Vecchi, Elda Cerchiari, I tempi dell'arte, volume 2, Bompiani, Milan, 1999. 
  Stefano Zuffi, Il Quattrocento, Electa, Milan, 2004. 

1501 paintings
Collections of the National Gallery of Art
Paintings of the Madonna and Child by Pietro Perugino